Salah Bakour (born April 15, 1982 in Rouen, France) is an Algerian football player.

Honours 
 Club:
 Won the Coupe Gambardella once with AJ Auxerre in 1999
 Finalist of the Coupe de la Ligue once with SM Caen in 2005
 Won the Belgian Second Division Championship once with K.V. Kortrijk in 2008
 Country:
 Has 1 cap for the Algeria National Team

References

External links 
 
 LFP Profile

1982 births
Living people
Algerian footballers
Ligue 1 players
Ligue 2 players
Belgian Pro League players
French people of Algerian descent
K.V. Kortrijk players
FC Istres players
Stade Malherbe Caen players
Algeria international footballers
Expatriate footballers in Belgium
Algerian expatriate footballers
Algerian expatriate sportspeople in Belgium
Footballers from Rouen
Association football defenders